Quin & Axtens Ltd v Salmon [1909] AC 442 is a UK company law case, concerning the enforceability by shareholders of provisions under a company's constitution.

Facts
Quin & Axtens Ltd was set up as a business of drapers, furnishing and general warehousemen at 422 to 440 Brixton Road, Brixton. Williams Axtens was the chairman. Joseph Salmon and another man, Arthur Way, were managing directors. Mr Boys-Tombs replaced Way in 1906. Axtens and Salmon held the majority of shares.

The constitution said no resolution would be effective if either Axtens or Salmons dissented (art 80). The directors were otherwise to manage the company (art 75). Axtens and Boys-Tombs wanted to buy and let some properties (buy 426 Brixton Road and let out 252 Stockwell Road), but Salmon disagreed. Then an extraordinary general meeting was held, where the same resolution was passed by a majority of shareholders.

Judgment
Lord Loreburn LC in the House of Lords upheld the Court of Appeal decision (with Lord Macnaghten, Lord James of Hereford and Lord Shaw of Dunfermline concurring), and stated:

See also

Automatic Self-Cleansing Filter Syndicate Co, Ltd v Cuninghame [1906] 2 Ch 34

Notes

United Kingdom company case law
House of Lords cases
1908 in case law
1908 in British law